The Süntel Formation, previously known as the Kimmeridge Formation (German: "Mittlerer Kimmeridge"; Middle Kimmeridge), is a geological formation in Germany. It is Late Jurassic in age, spanning the early to late Kimmeridgian stage. It predominantly consists of limestone deposited in shallow marine carbonate ramp conditions.

Description 

The formation is part of the Lower Saxony Basin that borders the Süntel massif of the Lower Saxon Hills, part of the larger Harz Mountains. The formation is described as alternations of glauconitic marl, limestone and sandstone.

Paleontological significance 
The formation is known for its fossils, with the Langenberg Quarry having provided fossils of numerous vertebrates.

Dinosaurs

Turtles

Squamates

Pterosaurs

Crocodyliformes

Mammaliaforms

Ichnofossils

See also 
 List of fossiliferous stratigraphic units in Germany

References

Bibliography 

 
 
 

Geologic formations of Germany
Jurassic System of Europe
Jurassic Germany
Kimmeridgian Stage
Limestone formations
Marl formations
Sandstone formations
Shallow marine deposits
Ichnofossiliferous formations
Fossiliferous stratigraphic units of Europe
Paleontology in Germany